Many Greek films have represented the Greek cinema in International Film Festivals. Greek films or (Greek co-productive films) have won accolades in the most famous International Film Festival such as Academy Awards, Golden Globe Awards, Cannes Festival, Venice Festival, Berlin Festival, Cyprus International Film Festival and other. Below are considered the awarded Greek films in the most notable international film festival.

Academy Awards

Golden Globes

Cannes International Film Festival

Berlin International Film Festival

Venice International Film Festival

Moscow International Film Festival

Shanghai International Film Festival

Locarno International Film Festival

European Film Awards

San Sebastian International Film Festival

Cairo International Film Festival

Mar del Plata International Film Festival

Chicago International Film Festival

Goya Awards

Fantasporto

Maverick Movie Awards

South East European Film Festival

Mumbai Awards

Cyprus International Film Festival

South East European Film Festival

See also
List of Greek Academy Award winners and nominees
List of Greek submissions for the Academy Award for Best Foreign Language Film

References

Award-winning films